John VI may refer to:

 Pope John VI (655–705), Pope from 701 to 705
 John VI of Constantinople (died 715), Patriarch of Constantinople from 712 to 715
 John VI, Syriac Orthodox Patriarch of Antioch (936–953)
 Yohannan VI, (fl. 1014), Patriarch of the Church of the East from 1012 to 1016
 John VI of Naples (died 1120 or 1123), Duke from 1097 or 1107 to his death
 John VI the Affluent, Armenian Catholicos of the Holy See of Cilicia (1203–1221)
 John VI Kantakouzenos (1292–1383), Byzantine Emperor from 1347 to 1354
 John VI, Count of Harcourt (1342–1389)
 John VI, Duke of Brittany (1389–1442)
 John VI, Duke of Mecklenburg (1439–1474)
 John VI, Count of Oldenburg (1501–1548
 John VI, Count of Nassau-Dillenburg (1535–1606)
 John VI, Prince of Anhalt-Zerbst (1621–1667)
 John VI of Portugal (1767–1826), King of the United Kingdom of Portugal, Brazil and the Algarves (1816–1825), King of Portugal and of the Algarves (1825–1826)

See also
John 6, the sixth chapter of the Gospel of John
Ioannes VI (disambiguation)

eo:Johano (regantoj)#Johano la 6-a